François Wahl (13 May 1925 - 15 September 2014) was a French editor and structuralist.

Biography
François Wahl was editor at the Éditions du Seuil, a publishing company in Paris. He was the editor of Jacques Lacan and Jacques Derrida, among others.

He was involved in the publication of Tel Quel. and he became friends with Roland Barthes and Philippe Sollers. He was Severo Sarduy's partner until the latter's death. He also taught philosophy to Elie Wiesel in the 1940s.

In 1987, Wahl, acting as Roland Barthes's literary executor, published his essays Incidents, which tells of his homosexual bouts with Moroccan young men, and Soirées de Paris, which chronicles his difficulty to find a male lover in Paris. Wahl met with controversy, compounded by the fact that he refused to publish more of Barthes's seminars.

References

External links 

 François Wahl collection on Severo Sarduy at Princeton University Library Special Collections

1925 births
2014 deaths
French philosophers
French gay writers
Structuralists
Analysands of Jacques Lacan